Edward (Ted) G. Jones (March 26, 1939, Upper Hutt, New Zealand – June 6, 2011, Davis, California) was an American neuroscientist and a prolific neuroanatomist.

One of his main contributions involves his Matrix-Core theory of thalamic organization. He authored a highly influential book entitled The Thalamus in 1985. Jones resided in California and served as director for the Center for Neuroscience at the University of California, Davis.

He was a former president of the Society for Neuroscience.

External links

 UC Davis Center for Neuroscience
 UC Davis Center for Neuroscience Memorial Page
 Personal Homepage at Center for Neuroscience, UC Davis
 BrainMaps.org, a high-resolution interactive brain atlas

American neuroscientists
1939 births
2011 deaths
New Zealand emigrants to the United States
Members of the United States National Academy of Sciences